Gopal Singh (29 November 1917 – 8 August 1990) was an Indian Governor and politician. He was also a former head of the country's Minorities' Commission and a writer.

Singh was the Governor of Goa from May 1987, earlier the Lieutenant Governor of Goa and first Governor of Nagaland. Singh was nominated member of Rajya Sabha from 3 April 1962 to 2 April 1968.

A litterateur, he translated the Granth Sahib, the Sikh scriptures, into English. He also was English-Punjabi lexicographer and biographer of Guru Nanak and Guru Gobind Singh.

References

1917 births
1990 deaths
Governors of Goa
Governors of Nagaland
Nominated members of the Rajya Sabha